Temuri Kobayevich Bukiya (born 2 April 1994) is a Russian professional football player. He plays for Elektron Veliky Novgorod.

Club career
He made his debut in the Russian Premier League on 28 April 2014 for FC Kuban Krasnodar in a game against FC Spartak Moscow.

References

External links
 

1994 births
Sportspeople from Sochi
Living people
Russian footballers
Russia youth international footballers
Russia under-21 international footballers
Association football midfielders
FC Kuban Krasnodar players
FC Volgar Astrakhan players
FC Spartak Moscow players
FC Spartak Vladikavkaz players
FC Fakel Voronezh players
FC Kyran players
Russian Premier League players
Russian First League players
Russian Second League players
Kazakhstan First Division players
Russian expatriate footballers
Russian expatriate sportspeople in Armenia
Expatriate footballers in Armenia
Russian expatriate sportspeople in Kazakhstan
Expatriate footballers in Kazakhstan